The 1993 Rolex 24 at Daytona was a 24-hour endurance sports car race held on January 30–31, 1993 at the Daytona International Speedway road course. The race served as the opening round of the 1993 IMSA GT Championship.

Victory overall and in the GTP class went to the No. 98 All American Racers Eagle MkIII driven by P. J. Jones, Rocky Moran, and Mark Dismore. Victory in the LM class went to the No. 2 Jaguar Racing Jaguar XJR-12 driven by Scott Goodyear, Scott Pruett, and Davy Jones. Victory in the GTS class went to the No. 11 Roush Racing Ford Mustang driven by Wally Dallenbach Jr., Robby Gordon, Robbie Buhl, and Tommy Kendall. Victory in the Lights class went to the No. 36 Erie Scientific Company Kudzu DG-1 driven by John Grooms, Frank Jellinek, Jim Downing, and Tim McAdam. Victory in the GTU class went to the No. 82 Wendy's Racing Team Mazda RX-7 driven by Dick Greer, Al Bacon, Peter Uria, and Mike Mees. Finally, victory in the INV GT class went to the No. 28 Cigarette Racing Porsche 964 Carrera driven by Enzo Calderari, Luigino Pagotto, Sandro Angelastri, and Ronny Meixner.

Race results
Class winners in bold.

References

24 Hours of Daytona
1993 in sports in Florida
1993 in American motorsport